Tydeo Larre Borges International Airport  is a general aviation airport serving Paysandú, capital of the Paysandú Department of Uruguay.

It is named in honour of Tydeo Larre Borges, a pioneer of Uruguayan and international aviation, who was the first South-American aviator to cross the South Atlantic.

The airport has been served by government air service provider TAMU (es) and charter operator Aviasur.

The Paysandu non-directional beacon (Ident: PN) is located on the field.

See also

Transport in Uruguay
List of airports in Uruguay

References

External links
OpenStreetMap - Paysandú
OurAirports - Tydeo Larre Borges Airport

Airports in Uruguay
Paysandú
Buildings and structures in Paysandú Department